Cherub of the Mist (also called Return of the Firecat) is a documentary film based on the life of two red pandas, namely, Mini and Sweety, who were released into the Singalila National Park in the Darjeeling District, India. The documentary which was filmed by Naresh Bedi and Rajesh Bedi over 2 years, followed Indian biologist Dr. Sunita Pradhan who at that time had been studying red pandas for over 10 years. It was the first time that someone had filmed the rare red pandas in their natural habitat and shows the animals in courtship, mating, nest building, and the rearing of cubs. Red pandas are found in Nepal, through North-eastern India and Bhutan, and into China and are listed in the Red Data Book. The population of red pandas at that time was estimated to be around 2,500.

General information
Format:  One-off / one hour
Location: India
Running Time: 53 minutes
Director: Naresh Bedi
Executive producers: Naresh & Rajesh Bedi
Cinematographer: Vijay Bedi, Ajay Bedi & Naresh Bedi
Editing: Ajay Bedi & Vijay Bedi
Production company: Bedi Films

Awards
29th IWFF Awards, Montana, US, 2006
 Best Conservation & Environmental
 Merit Award for Animal Behaviour
Wildscreen, UK, 2006
 Wildscreens Award to Promote Filmmakers from Developing Countries
 31st Banff Mountain Film Festival, Banff, Canada 2006
 Best Film on Mountain Environment 
 Audio Post Production Scholarship
 17th International Wildlife Film Festival, Albert, France 2007
 Award for the protection of the Animal Species
 Audience Award 
 Special Award of Young Audience
 Wildlife Asia Film Festival, Singapore 2007.
 The Loris Award 
 Best Asian Wildlife Film Nomination in craft category of Sound Recording
  Wildtalk Africa Wildlife Film Festival, Durban, South Africa 2007.
 Roscar Award for Best Limited Budget Film Award
 Nomination at Japan Wildlife Film Festival, Tokyo, Japan 2007
 Revelation Award at Vatavaran Wildlife Documentary Film Festival, New Delhi, India 2007.
  28th Annual News & Documentary Emmy Awards, New York, United States, 2007.
 Nomination for Craft Category of Editing - Ajay Bedi & Vijay Bedi

See also
Singalila National Park

References

External links
  Bedi Brothers official website

Indian documentary films
Northeast India